The Decatur Commodores were a professional minor league baseball team based in Decatur, Illinois that played for 64 seasons. The Commodores are the primary ancestor of today's Kane County Cougars. They played, with sporadic interruptions, from 1900 to 1974 in a variety of minor leagues, but spent the majority of their existence in the Illinois–Indiana–Iowa League (the "Three-I" League), later joining the Mississippi–Ohio Valley League (1952–1955) and the Midwest League (1956–1974). While they spent most of their years as an independent without formal major league baseball team affiliation, their primary affiliations were with the St. Louis Cardinals and later the San Francisco Giants, with isolated affiliations with the Detroit Tigers, Chicago Cubs and Philadelphia Phillies.

The ballparks
The Commodores played home games at Fans Field (1924–1974). Fans Field had a 5,200-seat grandstand which was demolished when the team moved to Wausau, Wisconsin in 1974 and became the Wausau Timbers. The field is still in use as a softball field.

Prior to the 1924 construction of Fans Field, the Commodores played at Staley Field (1915, 1922–1923). They shared Staley Field with the football team for which it was built, the Decatur Staleys. The Staleys were the early NFL franchise started by A.E. Staley and headed by George Halas that relocated from Decatur in 1922 and became the Chicago Bears. The Commodores began play at Downing Racetrack (now called Hess Park) in 1901.

Commodores nickname
The nickname Commodores refers to Stephen Decatur, for whom the city is named. The team was often called the "Commies" for short, from a time before that became a slang term for "Communist". In their final years, they wore hand-me-down Giants uniforms, although still called the "Commodores", leading some fans to call them the "Commodore Giants".

League Championships
 1928 – Illinois–Indiana–Iowa League Champions
 1952 – Mississippi-Ohio Valley League Champions
 1953 – Mississippi-Ohio Valley League Champions
 1957 – Midwest League Champions

No-hitters
The following no-hitters were pitched by Decatur pitchers in Midwest League play:
 5-31-52	Ed Garrett,		Mt. Vernon	5-1
 7-28-54	John Bumgarner,		Clinton	        1-0
 8-3-58	Gerald Fields,		Clinton	        5-0
 8-18-60	Bob Sprout,		Waterloo	3-0	22 strikeouts
 6-20-61	Vern Orndorff,		Clinton 	3-0	7 Innings Perfect Game
 8-13-63	Ollie Brown,		Wisconsin Rapids8-0
 6-7-66	Jesse Huggins,		Wisconsin Rapids1-0	7 Innings
 8-15-69	Gary Lavelle,		Clinton 	4-0	7 Innings
 5-31-72	Doug Capilla,		Appleton	1-0	7 Innings	
 6-12-74	Jeff Little,		Dubuque 	1-0	7 Innings

Notable alumni

Baseball Hall of Fame alumni

 Carl Hubbell (1927) Inducted, 1947

Notable alumni

 Bob Hartsfield (1974, MGR) 
 Johnnie LeMaster (1974)
 Bob Knepper (1973) 2 x MLB All-Star
 John Montefusco (1973) MLB All-Star; 1975 NL Rookie of the Year
 Ed Halicki (1972) 
 Butch Metzger (1972) 1976 NL Rookie of the Year
 John D'Acquisto (1971) 1974 NL Rookie Pitcher of the Year 
 Ed Figueroa (1970)
 Gary Lavelle (1969) 2 x MLB All-Star 
 Gary Matthews (1969) MLB All-Star; 1973 NL Rookie of the Year
 Elías Sosa (1969)
 Ron Bryant (1966) 1973 NL Wins Leader
 Tito Fuentes (1963) 
 Ollie Brown (1962–63)
 Don Bryant (1961) 
 Jim Northrup (1961) 
 Johnny Groth (1961, MGR)
 Mickey Stanley (1961) 4 x Gold Glove
 Jim Rooker (1960) 
 Jack Hamilton (1957)
 Jim Freeman (1952–54) First Black Decatur player
 Morrie Arnovich (1949–1950 MGR) MLB AS
 Bob Clear – 1947
 Bud Byerly (1941)
 Dick Sisler (1941) MLB All-Star
 Max Surkont (1940)
 Buddy Blattner (1939) Inducted Missouri Sports Hall of Fame (1980)
 Oscar Judd (1939) MLB All-Star
 Emil Verban (1939) 2 x MLB All-Star
 Murry Dickson (1936–38) MLB All-Star
 Eddie Lake (1938) 
 Bob Scheffing (1938)
 Jimmy Outlaw (1935) 
 Frank McCormick (1935) 8 x MLB All-Star; 1939 NL Runs Batted In Leader; 1940 NL Most Valuable Player
 Dutch Leonard (1932) 4 x MLB All-Star
 Skeeter Newsome (1932) 
 Claude Passeau (1932) 3 x MLB All-Star; 1939 AL Strikeouts Leader
 Odell Hale (1930)
 Rube Dessau (1928–1931 MGR)
 Hal McKain (1928)
 Ray Benge (1926)
 Pinky Whitney (1925–26) MLB All-Star
 Tom Oliver (1925)
 Denny Sothern (1925)
 Ben Dyer (1912–13)
 Heinie Groh (1911) 
 Grover Hartley (1910) 
 Grover Lowdermilk (1909–10) 
 Charlie Case (1908)
 Beany Jacobson (1903, 1908–09)

Memorable games
 May 30, 1909 – The Commodores win a 26-inning, 5-hour marathon over the Bloomington Bloomers 2–1. The 26 innings stays the record for the most innings in a completed professional game in the United States for 57 years.
 August 18, 1960 – 18-year-old, left-handed pitcher Bob Sprout of the Commodores pitched a no hitter against the Waterloo Hawks. In that game, Sprout struck out 22 hitters, which stands as the MWL single-game strikeout record. The Commies won by a 3–0 score.

In fiction
The Commodores appear in Harry Turtledove's Worldwar series, an alternate history in which aliens invade Earth in 1942 and the Second World War turns into an interplanetary war. Members of the team are on a train which is attacked by the aliens at the beginning of the invasion. One ball player is kidnapped by the invaders and is eventually taken by them to China, while another player and the team's manager escape and join the forces fighting the invasion. A considerable part of the series is described from these three characters' points of view, in which their baseball background plays a significant role in a number of ways.

See also
 Fans Field - Home of the Commodores

References

External links
 The Decatur Commodores in the Midwest League
 One Glorious Season: How Baseball Helped to Integrate Decatur, Illinois

Defunct minor league baseball teams
Defunct Midwest League teams
Defunct baseball teams in Illinois
Illinois-Indiana-Iowa League teams
Mississippi-Ohio Valley League
Professional baseball teams in Illinois
Commodores
Chicago Cubs minor league affiliates
Cincinnati Reds minor league affiliates
Detroit Tigers minor league affiliates
Philadelphia Phillies minor league affiliates
St. Louis Cardinals minor league affiliates
San Francisco Giants minor league affiliates
1900 establishments in Illinois
Baseball teams established in 1900
1974 disestablishments in Illinois
Sports clubs disestablished in 1974
Baseball teams disestablished in 1974
Northern Association teams